The Ermita Nuestra Señora de la Valvanera is a historic church in Coamo, Puerto Rico. It was built in 1685 and added to the National Register of Historic Places in 1986.

References

Roman Catholic churches completed in 1685
Churches on the National Register of Historic Places in Puerto Rico
Coamo, Puerto Rico
1685 establishments in the Spanish Empire
17th-century establishments in Puerto Rico
Roman Catholic churches in Puerto Rico